Bidad is an album of joint works of Parviz Meshkatian and Mohammad Reza Shajarian, which was released in 1985. This album consists of two parts: the first part is in Homayoun and composed by Parviz Meshkatian while the second part is in Homayoun and Shoor and is played by Qolamhossein Bigjekhani. Mohammad Reza Shajarian is the singer of both parts.

Lyrics are written by Hafez and Saadi.

Track listing

References

External links
Official website

Mohammad-Reza Shajarian albums
1985 albums
1980s classical albums